The Otto A.G.O. 70 hp aircraft engine was a six-cylinder, water cooled inline engine built by the German Gustav Otto Flugmaschinenwerke.

Design and development

The Otto A.G.O. (Aeromotor Gustav Otto) 70 hp engine was developed from the preceding four-cylinder 50 hp type by Hans Geisenhof at the Gustav Otto Flugmaschinenwerke.

The cylinders were cast separately from iron and then machined.
They were grouped together to a single block, joined at their cooling jackets by means of flanges and bolts.
There were two side valves per cylinder, which were operated from the camshaft, which was located on the left side of the engine block and driven from the crankshaft by spur gears.
The conjoined cylinder block incorporated a single intake duct running through the water jackets. 
Two Cudell-G.A.-carburettors were placed together mid-engine and fed into this intake duct from both ends via a common intake pipe.
The intake pipe and the carburettors were enclosed by heating jackets, which were integrated into the coolant circulation.
There was a single spark plug per cylinder, with the magneto located at the control side of the engine, driven from the crankshaft via an intermediate spur gear.

The crankshaft was supported by two intermediate and two outer plain bearings, with two additional thrust ball bearings at the propeller end.
Lubrication was pressure fed, with an oil pump feeding oil to the crankshaft bearings.

Specifications

See also

References

Bibliography 

1910s aircraft piston engines
Otto aircraft engines